Messehallen is a metro station located at Messe and Congress Center Hamburg on the border of the two Hamburg districts St. Pauli and Neustadt. The station was opened in 1970, and is served by Hamburg U-Bahn line U2.

Layout 

Entrances above ground are located at Karolinenstraße and Sievekingplatz, leading to spacious intermediate levels. The two side platforms are placed back-to-back in a  diameter railway pipe each, with access at either ends and intermediate connectors at a couple of locations, effectively making them one island platform.

Service 
Messehallen is served by Hamburg U-Bahn line U2; departures are every 5 minutes.

Gallery

See also 

 List of Hamburg U-Bahn stations

References

External links 

 Line and route network plans at hvv.de 

Hamburg U-Bahn stations in Hamburg
U2 (Hamburg U-Bahn) stations
Buildings and structures in Hamburg-Mitte
Railway stations in Germany opened in 1970
1970 establishments in West Germany